Henry Bret Ince QC (1830 – 7 May 1889) was a British businessman, writer, and politician.

Life
Ince was the eldest son of Edward Bret Ince, publisher of the Law Journal. He initially worked in shipping until he suffered an accident which limited his mobility and he was forced to change his career.  Accordingly, he learnt shorthand and started work as a reporter.  He became a leader writer for the Daily News.

He subsequently decided to study law, entering the Inner Temple in 1852. He was called to the bar in 1855. He reported the proceedings in Vice-Chancellor Wood's court for The Jurist.

In 1858, Ince published a legal commentary, "A systematic treatment of the Trustee Act, 1850, and the Extension Act of 1852". He migrated to Lincoln's Inn ad eundem in 1859. On 28 June 1875, he took silk, and he was made a bencher of Lincoln's Inn on 4 November 1878. He was elected Liberal Member of Parliament for Hastings in 1883. When that constituency was reduced by a member in 1885, he was returned for Islington East, but was defeated in 1886.

In 1862 he married Annie Muggeridge of Twickenham.  He died suddenly from a brain aneurysm at his chambers in Lincoln's Inn in May 1889.

References

External links 
 
 

1830 births
1889 deaths
Liberal Party (UK) MPs for English constituencies
Members of Lincoln's Inn
Members of the Inner Temple
UK MPs 1880–1885
UK MPs 1885–1886